"Why, Why" is a song written by Wayne Walker and Mel Tillis, performed by Carl Smith, and released on the Columbia label. In September 1957, it entered Billboard magazine's country chart, peaked at No. 2, and remained on the chart for 19 weeks. In Billboards annual poll of country music disc jockeys, it was rated No. 13 among the "Favorite C&W Records" of 1957. It was also ranked No. 18 on Billboards 1954 year-end country and western chart tracking the number of plays by disc jockeys.

See also
 Billboard Top Country & Western Records of 1954

References

Carl Smith (musician) songs
1957 songs